Krakor is a district in Pursat province, Cambodia. The district capital is Krakor town located 25 kilometres east of the provincial capital, Pursat town.

Location
Krakor is the easternmost district of Pursat province and borders Kampong Chhnang province to the east. To the north the district encompasses a portion of the Tonle Sap lake and there are several villages on the edge of the lake. These are Tonle Sap floating villages and their location moves depending on the water level in the lake. The districts of Kandieng and Sampov Meas form the eastern border and Phnum Kravanh district lies to the south. The district capital is at Krakor town, which is located on National Highway Number 5 about 160 kilometres by road from Phnom Penh.

Administration 
The following table shows the villages of Krakor district by commune.

Characteristics
According to the 1998 Census, Krakor district is made up of 11 communes and 103 villages. The population of the district was 74,222 in 14,347 households at the time of the last census.

The national highway and the only north-south rail link in the country bisect the district and thus most villages in the district have comparatively good access to goods and services. There is a former district Hospital at Krakor town  and the provincial capital and higher level services are only a short distance away. There is an active market that spills over onto the highway at Krakor town and this combined with the recent resurfacing of the highway has led to increasing traffic accidents and road fatalities.

Fishing Conflicts
Located on the Tonle Sap, Krakor district is well known for fishing and prahok trey ngiet and other fish products are exported to markets in Pursat and Phnom Penh. Most of these fish are collected by floating fishing villages in the northern part of the district, near the district town. These villagers have had an uneasy relationship with Fishery Administration officials over claims of illegal fishing in protected areas of the lake. In April 2007 this unease culminated in an incident that led to the deaths of three fishermen and the torching of the commune fisheries office. Three fishermen, including a pregnant woman, were shot and killed with AK-47s by a group of Fisheries officials who claimed they were attacked by the fishermen.

References

Districts of Pursat province